(Chloromethylene)triphenylphosphorane is the organophosphorus compound with he formula Ph3P=CHCl (Ph = phenyl).  It is a white solid but is usually generated and used in situ as a reagent in organic synthesis.  It is structurally and chemically related to methylenetriphenylphosphorane.

The reagent is prepared from the chloromethylphosphonium salt [Ph3PCH2Cl]Cl by treatment with strong base.  The phosphonium compound is generated by treatment of triphenylphosphine with chloroiodomethane.

(Chloromethylene)triphenylphosphorane converts aldehydes to vinyl chlorides:
RCHO  +  Ph3P=CHCl  →  RCH=CHCl  +  Ph3PO
These vinyl chlorides undergo dehydrochlorination to give alkynes:
RCH=CHCl  +  NaN(SiMe3)2  →  RC≡CH  +  NaCl  +  HN(SiMe3)2

Related compounds
(Iodomethylene)triphenylphosphorane
(Dichloromethylene)triphenylphosphorane

References

Organophosphorus compounds